Wom is the name of two different languages:
Wom language (Nigeria)
Wom language (Papua New Guinea)